Charles Bouzinac (born 10 January 1994) is a French international rugby league footballer who plays as a  for Lézignan Sangliers in the Elite One Championship. He has previously played for Toulouse Olympique in the Betfred Championship.

Bouzinac has previously played for the Central Queensland Capras in the Queensland Cup.

Charles Bouzinac played for Saint-Esteve XIII Catalan and Lézignan Sangliers in the Elite One Championship.

International career
He made his France début in 2015 against Serbia. He has also trained with the France A squad and represented his nation at junior level.

He was selected in France 9s squad for the 2019 Rugby League World Cup 9s.

References

External links

Toulouse Olympique XIII profile
Lézignan Sangliers profile

1994 births
Living people
AS Saint Estève players 
Central Queensland Capras players
France national rugby league team players
French rugby league players
Lézignan Sangliers players
Limoux Grizzlies players
Rugby league hookers
Toulouse Olympique players